Taylor Robert Collins is an American politician.

Early life and education
Collins's great-grandparents, John and Betty McCulley Sr., founded Oakville Feed and Produce, later renamed TriOak Foods, in 1951. Collins lives in Mediapolis, Iowa. He earned a bachelor's degree in business management at Iowa State University and a master's degree in public administration from Drake University. Collins has taught at Iowa Wesleyan University as an adjunct professor of economics and business.

Political career
In 2018, Collins served as president of the College Republicans at Iowa State University. After graduating, he chaired the Iowa Federation of College Republicans. Collins was a policy adviser to Kim Reynolds and a senior adviser to Adam Gregg. In January 2023, Collins began his campaign for the redrawn District 95 of the Iowa House of Representatives, as three-term lawmaker David Kerr announced his retirement and incumbent Charlie McClintock contested the District 42 seat in the Iowa Senate. During his first term in office, Collins served on the House Education Committee, responsible for determining the budgets of the University of Iowa, Iowa State University, and the University of Northern Iowa. Collins was floor manager for a bill which proposed that the budget allocated to diversity, equity, and inclusion initiatives at the three universities be used instead to lower the in-state tuition rate and fund scholarships for lower and middle income students.

References

21st-century American educators
Iowa Wesleyan University faculty
21st-century American politicians
Republican Party members of the Iowa House of Representatives
People from Des Moines County, Iowa
Living people
Year of birth missing (living people)